Karin Binder (born 28 August 1957) is a German politician and member of the "Die Linke."
From 1975 till 1998 she was a member of the SPD. In 2005 she became a member of Die Linke. She has been a member of the Bundestag since 2005. She was re-elected in 2009 and 2013. She did not seek re-election in 2017.

References

External links 
 Official website  

1957 births
Living people
Politicians from Stuttgart
Social Democratic Party of Germany politicians
Labour and Social Justice – The Electoral Alternative politicians
Members of the Bundestag for Baden-Württemberg
LGBT members of the Bundestag
Union of Persecutees of the Nazi Regime members
Female members of the Bundestag
21st-century German women politicians
Members of the Bundestag 2013–2017
Members of the Bundestag 2009–2013
Members of the Bundestag 2005–2009
Members of the Bundestag for The Left